Euonymus paniculatus is a species of plant in the family Celastraceae. It is endemic to Tamil Nadu in India.

References

paniculatus
Flora of Tamil Nadu
Endangered plants
Taxonomy articles created by Polbot